In mathematics, a cube root of a number  is a number  such that . All nonzero real numbers, have exactly one real cube root and a pair of complex conjugate cube roots, and all nonzero complex numbers have three distinct complex cube roots.

In some contexts, particularly when the number whose cube root is to be taken is a real number, one of the cube roots (in this particular case the real one) is referred to as the principal cube root, denoted with the radical sign  The cube root is the inverse function of the cube function if considering only real numbers, but not if considering also complex numbers: although one has always  the cube of a nonzero number has more than one complex cube root and its principal cube root may not be the number that was cubed. For example, but

Formal definition
The cube roots of a number x are the numbers y which satisfy the equation

Properties

Real numbers
For any real number x, there is one real number y such that y3 = x. The cube function is increasing, so does not give the same result for two different inputs, and it covers all real numbers. In other words, it is a bijection, or one-to-one. Then we can define an inverse function that is also one-to-one. For real numbers, we can define a unique cube root of all real numbers. If this definition is used, the cube root of a negative number is a negative number.

If x and y are allowed to be complex, then there are three solutions (if x is non-zero) and so x has three cube roots. A real number has one real cube root and two further cube roots which form a complex conjugate pair. For instance, the cube roots of 1 are:

The last two of these roots lead to a relationship between all roots of any real or complex number. If a number is one cube root of a particular real or complex number, the other two cube roots can be found by multiplying that cube root by one or the other of the two complex cube roots of 1.

Complex numbers

For complex numbers, the principal cube root is usually defined as the cube root that has the greatest real part, or, equivalently, the cube root whose argument has the least absolute value. It is related to the principal value of the natural logarithm by the formula

If we write x as

where r is a non-negative real number and θ lies in the range

,

then the principal complex cube root is

This means that in polar coordinates, we are taking the cube root of the radius and dividing the polar angle by three in order to define a cube root. With this definition, the principal cube root of a negative number is a complex number, and for instance  will not be −2, but rather .

This difficulty can also be solved by considering the cube root as a multivalued function: if we write the original complex number x in three equivalent forms, namely

The principal complex cube roots of these three forms are then respectively

Unless , these three complex numbers are distinct, even though the three representations of x were equivalent.

This is related with the concept of monodromy: if one follows by continuity the function cube root along a closed path around zero, after a turn the value of the cube root is multiplied (or divided) by

Impossibility of compass-and-straightedge construction

Cube roots arise in the problem of finding an angle whose measure is one third that of a given angle (angle trisection) and in the problem of finding the edge of a cube whose volume is twice that of a cube with a given edge (doubling the cube). In 1837 Pierre Wantzel proved that neither of these can be done with a compass-and-straightedge construction.

Numerical methods
Newton's method is an iterative method that can be used to calculate the cube root.  For real floating-point numbers this method reduces to the following iterative algorithm to produce successively better approximations of the cube root of a:

The method is simply averaging three factors chosen such that

at each iteration.

Halley's method improves upon this with an algorithm that converges more quickly with each iteration, albeit with more work per iteration:

This converges cubically, so two iterations do as much work as three iterations of Newton's method.  Each iteration of Newton's method costs two multiplications, one addition and one division, assuming that  is precomputed, so three iterations plus the precomputation require seven multiplications, three additions, and three divisions.

Each iteration of Halley's method requires three multiplications, three additions, and one division, so two iterations cost six multiplications, six additions, and two divisions.  Thus, Halley's method has the potential to be faster if one division is more expensive than three additions.

With either method a poor initial approximation of  can give very poor algorithm performance, and coming up with a good initial approximation is somewhat of a black art. Some implementations manipulate the exponent bits of the floating-point number; i.e. they arrive at an initial approximation by dividing the exponent by 3.

Also useful is this generalized continued fraction, based on the nth root method:

If x is a good first approximation to the cube root of a and y = a − x3, then:

The second equation combines each pair of fractions from the first into a single fraction, thus doubling the speed of convergence.

Appearance in solutions of third and fourth degree equations

Cubic equations, which are polynomial equations of the third degree (meaning the highest power of the unknown is 3) can always be solved for their three solutions in terms of cube roots and square roots (although simpler expressions only in terms of square roots exist for all three solutions, if at least one of them is a rational number). If two of the solutions are complex numbers, then all three solution expressions involve the real cube root of a real number, while if all three solutions are real numbers then they may be expressed in terms of the complex cube root of a complex number.

Quartic equations can also be solved in terms of cube roots and square roots.

History

The calculation of cube roots can be traced back to Babylonian mathematicians from as early as 1800 BCE. In the fourth century BCE Plato posed the problem of doubling the cube, which required a compass-and-straightedge construction of the edge of a cube with twice the volume of a given cube; this required the construction, now known to be impossible, of  the length .

A method for extracting cube roots appears in The Nine Chapters on the Mathematical Art, a Chinese mathematical text compiled around the 2nd century BCE and commented on by Liu Hui in the 3rd century CE. The Greek mathematician Hero of Alexandria devised a method for calculating cube roots in the 1st century CE. His formula is again mentioned by Eutokios in a commentary on Archimedes. In 499 CE Aryabhata, a mathematician-astronomer from the classical age of Indian mathematics and Indian astronomy, gave a method for finding the cube root of numbers having many digits in the Aryabhatiya (section 2.5).

See also
 Methods of computing square roots
 List of polynomial topics
 Nth root
 Square root
 Nested radical
 Root of unity
 Shifting nth-root algorithm

References

External links
 Cube root calculator reduces any number to simplest radical form
Computing the Cube Root, Ken Turkowski, Apple Technical Report #KT-32, 1998. Includes C source code.

Elementary special functions
Elementary algebra
Unary operations